Trichaptum sector is a plant pathogen infecting sweetgum trees.

References

Fungal tree pathogens and diseases
Hymenochaetales
Fungi described in 1820